The Mercian Supremacy was the period of Anglo-Saxon history between c. 716 and c. 825, when the kingdom of Mercia dominated the Anglo-Saxon Heptarchy in England. Sir Frank Stenton apparently coined the phrase, arguing that Offa of Mercia, who ruled 757–796, effectively achieved the unification of England south of the Humber estuary. Scholastic opinion on the relationship between the kingdoms of Wessex and Mercia at this time remains divided.

While the precise period during which the Mercian Supremacy existed remains uncertain – depending upon whether one includes the reigns of Penda (c. 626–655) and Wulfhere (658–675) – the end of the era is generally agreed to be around 825, following the defeat of King Beornwulf at the Battle of Ellandun (near present-day Swindon).

Nicholas Brooks noted that "the Mercians stand out as by far the most successful of the various early Anglo-Saxon peoples until the later ninth century" and with the exception of three years under Northumbrian domination, this is true between the years 633 and 825.

Recorded by Bede as the nemesis of early Anglo-Saxon Northumbria, Penda of Mercia achieved an early expansion of his kingdom's territory, but his reign ended with his death in battle, which was followed by a brief three-year period when Northumbria ruled over the Mercians. The rebellion against Northumbria by Penda's son Wulfhere in 658 immediately preceded the restoration of Penda's kingdom and a period of expansion in which Mercia's influence reached as far south as the Isle of Wight. During this period of expansion, Mercia lost its province of the Kingdom of Lindsey to Northumbria in 661, but its recapture by Æthelred of Mercia following the Battle of the Trent in 679 secured Mercia's position as the dominant Anglo-Saxon power for over a century.

Mercia's hold over the Anglo-Saxon kingdoms of Essex, Sussex and Kent seems to have been tenuous until 716, when Æthelbald of Mercia restored Mercia's hegemony for over forty years. Offa's accession in 757 heralded the beginning of a golden age for Mercia. Some historians have suggested that Offa's defeat of the Welsh and the West Saxons of Wessex established the Mercian Supremacy, which remained unchallenged until 825 when Egbert of Wessex supported an East Anglian rebellion against Beornwulf of Mercia, whose defeat at Ellendun effectively brought the Supremacy to an end.

References

Supremacy